Germany competed at the 1994 Winter Paralympics in Lillehammer, Norway. 43 competitors from Germany won 64 medals including 25 gold, 21 silver, and 18 bronze and finished 2nd in the medal table.

See also 
 Germany at the Paralympics
 Germany at the 1994 Winter Olympics

References 

1994
1994 in German sport
Nations at the 1994 Winter Paralympics